Campeonato Brasileiro 2005 may refer to:

Campeonato Brasileiro Série A 2005
Campeonato Brasileiro Série B 2005
Campeonato Brasileiro Série C 2005

See also 
 Campeonato Brasileiro (disambiguation)

pt:Campeonato Brasileiro de 2005